Polyommatus anticarmon, the anticarmon blue, is a butterfly in the family Lycaenidae. It was described by Ahmet Ömer Koçak in 1983. It is found in Turkey.

References

Butterflies described in 1983
Polyommatus
Butterflies of Asia
Butterflies of Europe